Walking in the Kingdom is an American religious TV show produced by Living Faith Television (LFTV) that began broadcasting on WLFG in Grundy, Virginia, on October 13, 2005. The show was created by Tom Renfro, MD and is hosted by him and Sid Renfro. The show is divided into three parts: Christian round table discussions, scripture reading and songs of worship.

At least 40 hours a week are recorded for the show, which are then edited into a 30 minute program. It is taped at the Renfro Manor. The program airs on LFTV and Heritage TV.

Creator and co-host
Dr. Thomas E. Renfro, born February 7, 1955, in Norton, Virginia to Mildred and Ed Renfro, is best known for overcoming his battle with Mantle Cell Lymphoma. He graduated from the University of Virginia, and became a medical doctor. Renfro had one son, Jason, who died in a farming accident. He is married to Sid Renfro.

Renfro has appeared on many religious TV shows, such as The 700 Club giving his testimony. He is an ordained minister.

Production cast and crew
The TV series operates under a small crew.

Hosts: Dr. Tom Renfro and Sid Renfro
Director: Dr. Tom Renfro
Assistant Director: Davin S. Stanley
Supervising Editor: Jeff Newberry
Assistant Editor: Davin S. Stanley
Producers: Dr. Tom and Sid Renfro

Production Company: Living Faith Television

References

External links
 Walking in the Kingdom
 Dr. Renfro's official website
 WLFG-TV
 

2000s American television talk shows
Local talk shows in the United States
Christian entertainment television series
Christian mass media in the United States
2010s American television talk shows